is Beni's eleventh single under the label Nayutawave Records. "Suki Dakara" is a "sad love song that paints a love that you don't give up on even though it may be hard and it hurts." The song is said to be similar to her previous released songs "Mō Nido to..." and "Koi Kogarete" Both songs were later added on Beni's 7th album (4th under Nayutawave Records) "Fortune".

Track list

Charts

References

2011 singles
Beni (singer) songs
2011 songs